Stav Sherez (born 1970) is a British novelist whose first novel, The Devil's Playground, was published in 2004 by Penguin Books and was shortlisted for the CWA John Creasey Dagger. In July 2018 he won the Theakston's Old Peculier Crime Novel of the Year Award for his fifth novel, The Intrusions, the third outing for his detectives Jack Carrigan and Geneva Miller.

Biography
Born in 1970, Sherez grew up in London and attended Latymer Upper School and the University of Leeds. Sherez's second novel, The Black Monastery, was published by Faber & Faber in April 2009. From 1999 to 2004 he was a main contributor to the music magazine Comes with a Smile. From December 2006 he has been literary editor of the Catholic Herald.

Bibliography

Novels
The Devil's Playground 2004 (Penguin) – Shortlisted for the CWA John Creasey Best First Novel Award
The Black Monastery 2009 (Faber & Faber)
A Dark Redemption 2012 (Faber & Faber) – Shortlisted for the Theakston's Old Peculier Crime Novel of the Year Award 2013
Eleven Days 2013 (Faber & Faber) – Shortlisted for the Theakston's Old Peculier Crime Novel of the Year Award 2014
The Intrusions 2017 (Faber & Faber) – Winner of the Theakston's Old Peculier Crime Novel of the Year Award 2018

Short stories
"God Box", published in Perverted by Language: Fiction Inspired by the Fall, Serpent's Tail 2007
"Hotel Room", published in The Flash, Social Disease 2007

References

External links
 Author website

21st-century British novelists
Living people
1970 births
British male novelists
21st-century British male writers